Hohenzollernplatz is a Berlin U-Bahn station located in the Wilmersdorf district on the  line.

The station opened with the first section of the U3 from Wittenbergplatz to Thielplatz on 12 October 1913. As of Heidelberger Platz the architect was Wilhelm Leitgebel.

References

U3 (Berlin U-Bahn) stations
Buildings and structures in Charlottenburg-Wilmersdorf
Railway stations in Germany opened in 1913